The Jelení hora (German: Haßberg) is a  high mountain in the Czech part of the Ore Mountains.

Location and surrounding area 
The mountain lies immediately southeast of the village of Kryštofovy Hamry (Christophhammer).

Routes to the summit 
The route to the summit sets out from the dam wall on the Preßnitz Reservoir, which is crossed on foot, and follows the metalled track uphill to about 500 m after the dam where another metalled track branches off to the right. It follows this for about 400 m to the first bend in the track where it turns left onto a steep, straight path. Where this climb ends after about 1600 m, the route leaves the track, again to the left, and onto a footpath. After a final short climb this reaches the plateau of the Jelení hora.

Description 
The steep, narrow and sparsely wooded basalt Kuppe of the mountain is striking as it rises above the broad plateaus of the Ore Mountain ridge and offers a good view of the Upper Ore Mountains and a glimpse into the Eger valley. At its highest elevation is a summit cross with a summit register.

See also 
List of mountains in the Ore Mountains

Mountains and hills of the Czech Republic
Mountains of the Ore Mountains
Mountains under 1000 metres